Curson may refer to:
Curson (demon) (also Purson), a demon in the Ars Goetia
Robert of Courçon (c. 1160–1219), English Cardinal
Robert Curson (c. 1460–1535), English Soldier, Courtier and spy
Curson baronets, of Water Perry, Oxford England
David Curson (born 1948), American politician
Ted Curson (1935–2012), American jazz musician

See also
Curzon (disambiguation)
Kurson, a surname
Chanos-Curson, a French commune